Nicha Lertpitaksinchai and Peangtarn Plipuech were the defending champions, having won the event in 2013, but both chose to participate in Phuket instead.

Jocelyn Rae and Anna Smith won the title, defeating Shuko Aoyama and Keri Wong in the final, 6–4, 6–4.

Seeds

Draw

References 
 Draw

Kentucky Bank Tennis Championships - Women's Doubles
2014 WD